Mesogyrus is an extinct genus of fossil beetles in the family Gyrinidae, containing the following species:

 †Mesogyrus anglicus Ponomarenko et al. 2005 Durlston Formation, United Kingdom, Berriasian
†Mesogyrus antiquus Ponomarenko, 1973 Karabastau Formation, Kazakhstan, Oxfordian
†Mesogyrus elongates Ponomarenko 2014 Sharteg, Mongolia, Tithonian
 †Mesogyrus sibiricus Ponomarenko, 1985 Abasheva Formation, Russia, Pliensbachian
 †Mesogyrus striatus Ponomarenko, 1973 Byankinskaya Formation, Russia, Tithonian Daya Formation, Russia Hauterivian Turga Formation, Russia, Aptian

References

†
Fossil taxa described in 1973
†
Prehistoric beetle genera